Cottonwood is a city in Yavapai County, Arizona, United States. According to the 2010 census, the population of the city is 11,265.

Geography 
Cottonwood is located at  (34.7321, -112.0186).

Climate
Cottonwood has a semi-arid steppe climate.

Demographics

At the 2000 census there were 9,179 people, 3,983 households and 2,369 families in the city. The racial makeup of the city was 85.2% White, 0.5% Black or African American, 1.6% Native American, 0.4% Asian, <0.1% Pacific Islander, 9.7% from other races, and 2.6% from two or more races. 20.5% of the population were Hispanic or Latino of any race.
Of the 3,983 households 25.3% had children under the age of 18 living with them, 44.5% were married couples living together, 10.8% had a female as Head of Household with no Husband present, and 40.5% were non-families. 34.4% of households were one person and 19.1% were one person aged 65 or older. The average household size was 2.27 and the average family size was 2.90.

The age distribution was 23.4% under the age of 18, 8.2% from 18 to 24, 23.3% from 25 to 44, 21.4% from 45 to 64, and 23.8% 65 or older. The median age was 41 years. For every 100 females, there were 86.9 males. For every 100 females age 18 and over, there were 81.4 males.

The median household income was $27,444 and the median family income  was $37,794. Males had a median income of $24,308 versus $19,977 for females. The per capita income for the city was $17,518. About 8.9% of families and 13.5% of the population were below the poverty line, including 19.5% of those under age 18 and 11.3% of those age 65 or over.

The city became one of the Arizona municipalities to approve of civil unions for same-sex partners.

Economy 
Cottonwood is the economic heart of the Verde Valley. The City of Cottonwood recently went through an extensive re-branding process and is now known as the “Heart of Arizona Wine Country".  Focused on the Old Town Cottonwood tourist area, the City is the epicenter of the renowned Verde Valley wine region of Arizona.

Education
Cottonwood-Oak Creek School District operates public schools.

Library
The Cottonwood Public Library is part of the Yavapai County Library Network and serves the city of Cottonwood along with surrounding cities including Clarkdale, Camp Verde, Jerome, Rimrock and unincorporated areas of the Verde Valley in Yavapai County.

Transportation
The city is served by Cottonwood Airport, a general aviation facility.

Notable people

 Frederick Henry Ball – American movie studio executive and younger brother of Lucille Ball.
 Junior Brown – country singer and guitarist
 Ray Manley – photographer
 June Miller – Second wife of writer Henry Miller
 John Pedersen – arms designer, known for the Pedersen device
 Alvie Self – singer, member of Rockabilly Hall of Fame
 Max Terhune  – actor (1891–1973)
 Ambyr Childers  – actress

See also
 List of historic properties in Cottonwood, Arizona
 Cottonwood Airport

References

External links

 City of Cottonwood
 Verde Independent – local newspaper
 Cottonwood Chamber of Commerce

Cities in Arizona
Cities in Yavapai County, Arizona
Year of establishment missing